The Ministry of National Education, Youth and Sports, or simply Ministry of National Education, as the title has changed several times in the course of the Fifth Republic, is the Government of France cabinet member charged with running the country's public educational system and with the supervision of agreements and authorisations for private teaching organisations.

The ministry's headquarters is located in the 18th century Hôtel de Rochechouart on the Rue de Grenelle in the 7th arrondissement of Paris. Given that education is France's largest employment domain, the ministry directs the work of more than half of the state civil servants. The position is therefore traditionally a strategic one. Pap Ndiaye was appointed as Minister of National Education in 2022.

History
A governmental position overseeing public education was first created in France in 1802. Following the various regime changes in France in the first decades of the 19th century, the position changed official status and name a number of times before the position of Minister of Public Instruction was created in 1828. For much of its history, the position was combined with that of Minister of Public Worship, who dealt with issues related to the Roman Catholic Church, except in instances where the Minister of Public Instruction was a Protestant.  The position has also occasionally been combined with Minister of Sports and Minister of Youth Affairs.  In 1932, the office's title was changed to Minister of National Education, although it was briefly changed back in 1940–1941, and was renamed Minister of Education during the Presidency of Valéry Giscard d'Estaing (1974–1981). In 1975, it created the Comité d'études sur les formations d'ingénieurs which studies the training and job placement of engineers in France.

See also
 List of Education Ministers of France
 Education in France
 Minister of Higher Education, Research and Innovation (France)

References

External links
France Ministry of National Education – Official website 

Education in France
France
Education policy in France
National Education
Educational administration